Jasienica may refer to the following places in Poland:
 Jasienica, Police - a district of Police, Poland, town in the Pomerania Region
Jasienica, Lower Silesian Voivodeship (south-west Poland)
Jasienica, Lublin Voivodeship (east Poland)
Jasienica, Silesian Voivodeship (south Poland)
Jasienica, Lesser Poland Voivodeship (south Poland)
Jasienica, Świętokrzyskie Voivodeship (south-central Poland)
Jasienica, Ostrów Mazowiecka County in Masovian Voivodeship (east-central Poland)
Jasienica, Wołomin County in Masovian Voivodeship (east-central Poland)
Jasienica, Lubusz Voivodeship (west Poland)
Jasienica Rosielna, current name of Jasienica in Austrian Galicia (south-east Poland)

It may also refer to:
Paweł Jasienica, pseudonym of Polish journalist and writer Lech Beynar